Tommy Grant (January 9, 1935 – October 18, 2011) was a professional Canadian football player who played for 14 years in the Canadian Football League with the Hamilton Tiger-Cats and the Winnipeg Blue Bombers.

Junior football
Tommy Grant played for the Windsor AKO Fratmen junior team that played in the Canadian Junior final.

CFL
Grant played 13 years with the Hamilton Tiger-Cats from 1956 to 1968 and one more with the Winnipeg Blue Bombers in 1969. An all-star twice (as a running back and flanker) he rushed for 559 yards and caught 329 passes for 6542 yards in his career. He won the Gruen Trophy as the best rookie in the East in 1956 and the CFL's Most Outstanding Canadian Award in 1964. He played in nine Grey Cup games, all with Hamilton, winning four of them.

Grant was inducted into the Canadian Football Hall of Fame in 1995.

Video clips

External links
Tommy Grant's profile at the Windsor/Essex County Sports Hall of Fame
Profile as Ti-Cat Wall of Honour inductee 2010

1935 births
2011 deaths
Sportspeople from Windsor, Ontario
Players of Canadian football from Ontario
Canadian football running backs
Canadian football wide receivers
Hamilton Tiger-Cats players
Winnipeg Blue Bombers players
Canadian Football League Rookie of the Year Award winners
Canadian Football League Most Outstanding Canadian Award winners
Canadian Football Hall of Fame inductees